Stare Guty  is a village in the administrative district of Gmina Pisz within Pisz County, Warmian-Masurian Voivodeship, in northern Poland.

References

Stare Guty